2 is the second studio album by Australian music collective Sneaky Sound System, released on 16 August 2008.

Information
The album was produced by Black Angus and Donnie Sloan and mixed by 'Spike' Stent and Paul PDub Walton (Madonna, Björk, Massive Attack, Gwen Stefani) at Olympic Studios in London. The first single to be released from the album Kansas City was released on 12 July 2008. The album was available for pre-order on the Australian iTunes Store.

Singles
 "Kansas City" was the first single off the album, it was released on 12 July 2008. The song debuted on the Australian chart at 16 and peaked four weeks later at 14, becoming their second biggest hit after "UFO". On the twelfth week it dropped to 45 and the next week dropped out of the top 50.
 "When We Were Young" was the second single off the album, it was released on 15 November 2008. The song did not show as much success as "Kansas City", it was their second single not to enter the top 100 after "Tease Me" but it did chart at 16 on the dance chart and 7 on the independent chart, the remix also charted at 9 in the club chart.
 "16" was the third single off the album, it was released on 14 February 2009. The song was announced on their official website.
 "It's Not My Problem" was the fourth and final single off the album, it was released on 4 September 2009. It has reached a peak of No. 8 on the Australian Club Chart and No. 79 on the Australian Airplay Chart.

Track listing

Personnel
 Connie Mitchell – vocals
 Black Angus – producer
 Donnie Sloan – producer
 Mike 'Spike' Stent – mixer (track 1)
 Paul 'PDub' Walton – mixer

Charts
In Australia, the album debuted at No. 1, selling 8,870 copies, beating out the previous No. 1, the Mamma Mia! soundtrack which sold 7651 copies.

Weekly charts

Year-end charts

Certifications

Release history
The album was released in Australia on 16 August 2008 with a limited edition disc containing remixes from their debut album Sneaky Sound System as well as the singles from this album.

References

Sneaky Sound System albums
2008 albums
Whack Records albums